Tomasz Unton (born 1 November 1970) is a Polish former footballer. Unton spent the majority of his career playing in Pomerania, with his longest spell at Lechia Gdańsk.

Senior career

Unton began his career at the youth levels with Arka Gdynia before joining Arka's rivals Lechia Gdańsk in 1988. During his 8 seasons at Lechia, Unton played 212 times in the league, and scored 36 goals placing him in the top 20 for all time appearances and goals scored while playing for Lechia. Despite an enjoyable time with Lechia, Unton's most successful period was his time with Legia Warsaw. Despite only playing 14 games in all competitions, Unton won the Ekstraklasa and the Puchar Polski before leaving the club months after he joined.

After Legia, Unton rejoined Lechia, now called Olimpia-Lechia Gdańsk due to a merger from Lechia Gdańsk and Olimpia Poznań. After the season Olimpia-Lechia were relegated, and Unton joined Polonia Warsaw. This started a period of Unton rarely staying at a club for more than one season. After Polonia, Unton played for Śląsk Wrocław, before playing for lower league Pomoranian sides Wierzyca Starogard Gdański and Stilon Gorzów Wielkopolski. Unton had a brief spell in Germany from 1998 to 2000 with Eisenhüttenstädter FC Stahl, before re-joining Arka Gdynia who he played for as a youth. With Arka, Unton won promotion from the third tier, after winning the league. Unton played for 3 more teams after Arka, all smaller Pomeranian teams, Kaszuby Połchowo from Połchowo, GKS Luzino from Luzino, and Zatoka Puck from Puck.

Managerial career

In 2007 Unton started his managerial career with Gryf Wejherowo. It took 7 years before his next managerial position which came at Lechia Gdańsk, a position he held from Sep 21 2014 - Nov 17 2014.

Personal life

Unton was born in Szczecin, where his father played football for Arkonia Szczecin, and his mother played handball for Pogoń Szczecin.

Honours
Legia Warsaw
Ekstraklasa: 1994–95
Polish Cup: 1995

References 

1970 births
Living people
Sportspeople from Szczecin
Association football midfielders
Polish footballers
Lechia Gdańsk players
Śląsk Wrocław players
Polonia Warsaw players
Legia Warsaw players
Eisenhüttenstädter FC Stahl players
Ekstraklasa players
Regionalliga players
Polish football managers
Lechia Gdańsk managers
Ekstraklasa managers
Polish expatriate footballers
Expatriate footballers in Germany
Polish expatriate sportspeople in Germany